Luis Alfonso Rodríguez Alanís (born 21 January 1991), sometimes known as Chaka, is a Mexican professional footballer who plays as a right-back for Liga MX club Juárez.

Club career

Monterrey
Rodríguez made his debut with Monterrey on 24 July 2011 as a starter in a match against San Luis in a 1–1 draw.

Rodríguez joined San Luis on loan for the 2012–13 season.

Tigres UANL
During the 2016 draft it was announced that Tigres UANL had purchased him.

International career
On 15 April 2015, Rodríguez made his debut with the senior national team in a friendly game against the United States.

Rodríguez participated in every match during the Gold Cup as Mexico went on to win the tournament. He was included in the tournament's Best XI.

Career statistics

International

Scores and results list Mexico's goal tally first.

Honours
Monterrey
Mexican Primera División: Apertura 2010
CONCACAF Champions League: 2010–11

Tigres UANL
Liga MX: Apertura 2016, Apertura 2017, Clausura 2019
Campeón de Campeones: 2016, 2017, 2018
CONCACAF Champions League: 2020
Campeones Cup: 2018

Mexico
CONCACAF Gold Cup: 2019

Individual
Liga MX Best XI: Apertura 2017, Clausura 2019
CONCACAF Gold Cup Best XI: 2019
CONCACAF Champions League Team of the Tournament: 2020

References

External links
 
 
 
 Luis Alfonso Rodríguez at ESPN Deportes
 Monterrey profile

1991 births
Living people
Footballers from Nuevo León
C.F. Monterrey players
San Luis F.C. players
Chiapas F.C. footballers
Tigres UANL footballers
People from San Nicolás de los Garza
Mexico international footballers
Association football midfielders
Association football utility players
2017 CONCACAF Gold Cup players
2019 CONCACAF Gold Cup players
CONCACAF Gold Cup-winning players
2021 CONCACAF Gold Cup players
Mexican footballers